This is a list of cities and towns in Papua New Guinea by population.

Many of these figures were taken from the most recent PNG census, which was in the year 2000. Many population centres will have substantially grown since the year 2000 (such as Port Moresby, Lae, Kimbe, Kokopo, Aitape and Mendi) due to increasing urbanisation in Papua New Guinea, and disaster recovery. On the other hand, Arawa has shrunk dramatically since 1990 due to war.

List of cities and towns
Only population areas with more than 5,000 people, or notable centres are ranked.

* Denotes a capital city.~ Is an estimated population, all other populations were determined by the most recent census, in the year 2000. The next PNG census will be held in 2010.? Denotes a population with an undetermined rank.

Disaster and population shift
Natural and man-made disaster historically plays a major role in population shift in Papua New Guinea. The most notable are:

See also

 Provinces of Papua New Guinea
 Regions of Papua New Guinea
 Districts of Papua New Guinea
 Local-level governments of Papua New Guinea
 List of cities and towns in Papua New Guinea

References

 
Cities